The 2011 Foxtel Cup was the inaugural season of the Australian rules football club knockout cup competition involving clubs from the various state league competitions from around Australia. The first year of the competition also included the AFL's newest expansion side Greater Western Sydney Giants.

Its purpose was to support and promote the second-tier Australian rules football competitions and to provide another way of developing the lower-tier AFL players. It was originally designed to be a one-off, but due to a significant amount of public interest the AFL said the competition would continue for at least the next five years.

The competition began on 26 March 2011 and ran through to August. Matches were played as curtain-raisers to AFL Saturday night games and were screened on Fox Sports in a late-afternoon slot between afternoon and night AFL matches. $40,000 of prize money was awarded to eventual winners, Williamstown Football Club.

The AFL originally invited the three highest ranked teams from the South Australian National Football League, the Victorian Football League and the West Australian Football League; the top two teams from the Queensland Australian Football League; and the top team from AFL Sydney and the Tasmanian Football League. The Northern Territory Football Club and Greater Western Sydney Giants received special invitations.

However, despite the SANFL on 9 December 2010 signing on to be part of the Cup competition, opposition to the proposal came from its top three clubs Central District, Norwood and Woodville-West Torrens. The three clubs were given until 14 December 2010 to reconsider with the SANFL willing to extend invitations to its next best teams from 2010 if its top three clubs refused to participate. After the top five SANFL clubs released a joint statement on 15 December 2010 declining the invitation to participate in the Cup competition, citing lack of prize money, sponsorship conflicts, salary cap implications, schedule concerns and removing the focus from their SANFL premiership ambitions, their places were taken up by fellow SANFL clubs West Adelaide, North Adelaide and Port Adelaide Magpies.

The AFL gave the Cup competition the go ahead on 17 December 2010 with the fixture released publicly. The official name of the tournament (Foxtel Cup), finalised fixture and participating teams were formalised on 9 February 2011 by the AFL.

Williamstown became the inaugural Foxtel Cup champions when they defeated Claremont by 21 points in the Grand Final at Patersons Stadium on 6 August 2011. Williamstown midfielder Ben Jolley won the Coles Medal as best afield for his game-high 30 possessions and eight clearances.

2011 season

Participating clubs 

 NEAFL Eastern Conference (2)
 Ainslie
 Greater Western Sydney
 NEAFL Eastern Conference (3)
 Labrador
 Morningside
 Northern Territory
 SANFL (3)
 North Adelaide
 Port Adelaide Magpies
 West Adelaide

 Sydney AFL (1)
 East Coast Eagles
 TFL (1)
 Clarence
 VFL (3)
 North Ballarat
 Northern Bullants
 Williamstown
 WAFL (3)
 Claremont
 East Perth
 Swan Districts

Club details

Stadiums

Fixtures

Bracket

Round of 16

Quarter-finals

Semi-finals

Grand final

References

External links 
 Official Foxtel Cup website
 Official AFL Canberra website
 AFL Northern Territory
 AFL Queensland State Site
 
 Official Sydney AFL Site
 Tasmanian Football League Website
 
 

Foxtel Cup
Foxtel